Laurel Collins  (born May 7, 1984) is a Canadian politician who was elected to represent the riding of Victoria in the House of Commons of Canada in the 2019 Canadian federal election. Prior to her election in the House of Commons, she was a city councillor for Victoria City Council. She is the NDP Critic for the Environment and Climate Change and the NDP Deputy Caucus Chair.

Background 
Collins was born in Kispiox in northern British Columbia, one of three children. Her parents, school teachers, separated when she was a baby, and she moved around the province, attending elementary school on Salt Spring Island, Alert Bay, and in Port Hardy. She went to high school in Sussex, New Brunswick and did her undergraduate degree at the University of Kings College and Dalhousie University in Halifax, Nova Scotia. She did a master's degree in Human Security and Peacebuilding at Royal Roads University.

Career 
Collins worked at Victoria Women in Need, running programs for women who have experienced abuse. She co-founded and co-chaired Divest Victoria, a non-profit organization that advocates for cities to take their money out of fossil fuels and put them into environmentally responsible investments. While researching climate migration and displacement, she worked with the United Nations High Commissioner for Refugees (UNHCR) in Northern Uganda helping to create durable solutions for internally displaced persons in the aftermath of deadly conflict.

From 2014 to 2019, Collins taught courses at the University of Victoria, including courses in Social Inequality, Social Justice Studies, Political Sociology, and the Sociology of Genders. In 2015, she co-published a book, Women, Adult Education, and Leadership in Canada. And, in 2017, she won a Victoria Community Leadership Award in Sustainability and Community Building.

In October 2018 Collins was elected as a councillor for the City of Victoria with the electoral organization Together Victoria. She would resign from this position a year later, after her election to the House of Commons in late October, 2019. The byelection following her departure was delayed due to the coronavirus pandemic until December 2020, where it eventually resulted in the election of Stephen Andrew and the defeat of Together Victoria's candidate Stephanie Hardman.

Collins was re-elected in the 2021 federal election.

She is the NDP Critic for the Environment and Climate Change and the Deputy Critic for Families, Children, and Social Development.

Electoral record

References

External links

Living people
New Democratic Party MPs
Members of the House of Commons of Canada from British Columbia
Victoria, British Columbia city councillors
Year of birth uncertain
Women members of the House of Commons of Canada
1984 births